The 1970 UC Santa Barbara Gauchos football team represented the University of California, Santa Barbara (UCSB) as a member of the Pacific Coast Athletic Association (PCAA) during the 1970 NCAA University Division football season. Led by first-year head coach Andy Everest, the Gauchos compiled an overall record of 2–9 with a mark of 1–5 in conference play, placing sixth in the PCAA. The team played home games at Campus Stadium in Santa Barbara, California.

Schedule

References

UC Santa Barbara
UC Santa Barbara Gauchos football seasons
UC Santa Barbara Gauchos football